Leland Ryken (born May 17, 1942) is professor of English emeritus at Wheaton College in Wheaton, Illinois.  He has contributed a number of works to the study of classic literature from the Christian perspective, including editing the comprehensive volume on Christian writing on literature The Christian Imagination. He was the literary stylist for the English Standard Version of the Bible, published by Crossway Bibles in 2001. He is the author of How to Read the Bible as Literature and Words of Delight: A Literary Introduction to the Bible, as well as co-editor of Ryken's Bible Handbook and the ESV Literary Study Bible (with his son, Philip Ryken).  He was the literary content contributor to the ESV Study Bible, released in 2008.

Bibliography
 The Legacy of the King James Bible: Celebrating 400 Years of the Most Influential English Translation.  (2010).
 Understanding English Bible Translation: The Case for an Essentially Literal Approach.  (2009).
 A Reader's Guide to Caspian: A Journey into C.S. Lewis's Narnia.  (2008).
 Preach the Word: Essays on Expository Preaching: In Honor of R. Kent Hughes.  (2008).
 The Literary Study Bible: ESV.  (2007).
 Translating Truth: The Case for Essentially Literal Bible Translation.  (2005).
 The Liberated Imagination: Thinking Christianly about the Arts.  (2005).
 Ryken's Bible Handbook.  (2005).
 A Reader's Guide Through the Wardrobe: Exploring C.S. Lewis Classic Story.  (2005).
 Choosing a Bible: Understanding Bible Translation Differences.  (2005).
 Realms of Gold: The Classics in Christian Perspective.  (2003).
 The Christian Imagination: The Practice of Faith in Literature and Writing.  (2002).
 Reading for Life: 100 Christian College Teachers Reflect on the Books That Shaped Their Lives.  (2002).
 The Word of God in English: Criteria for Excellence in Bible Translation.  (2002).
 Work and Leisure in Christian Perspective.  (2002).
 Windows to the World: Literature in Christian Perspective.  (2000).
 Redeeming the Time: A Christian Approach to Work and Leisure.  (1995).
 The Discerning Reader: Christian Perspectives on Literature and Theory.  (1995).
 A Complete Literary Guide to the Bible.  (1993).
 Words of Delight: A Literary Introduction to the Bible. (1993).
 Contemporary Literary Theory: A Christian Appraisal.  (1991).
 Worldly Saints: The Puritans As They Really Were.  (1990).
 Effective Bible Teaching.  (1988).
 Words of Life: A Literary Introduction to the New Testament.  (1987).
 The New Testament in Literary Criticism.  (1985).
 How to Read the Bible as Literature.  (1985).
 Milton and Scriptural Tradition: The Bible into Poetry.  (1984).
 Triumphs of the Imagination: Literature in Christian Perspective.  (1979).
 The Literature of the Bible.  (1974).
 Apocalyptic Vision in "Paradise Lost".  (1970).

References

American academics of English literature
People from Wheaton, Illinois
Wheaton College (Illinois) faculty
Journalists from Illinois
Living people
1942 births